William Mylrea  was Archdeacon of Man from 18 July 1760 until his death on 14 September 1787.

He was Rector of Bride then Andreas.

Notes

See also

Archdeacons of Man
18th-century Manx Anglican priests
1787 deaths
1712 births